Bari is the second largest continental city of southern Italy.

Bari may also refer to:

Languages
 Bari dialect, a dialect of Neapolitan spoken in the Apulia and Basilicata regions of Italy
 Bari language, spoken in South Sudan, Uganda, and Democratic Republic of Congo
 Bari language (Ubangian), a Ubangian language of South Sudan
 Barí language a chinchan language of Colombia and Venezuela

Places

India
 Bari (Odisha Vidhan Sabha constituency), in Jajpur, Odisha
 Bari, Himachal Pradesh
 Bari, India, Rajasthan
 Jorasanko Thakur Bari, the ancestral home of the Tagore family, West Bengal
 Bari, Raebareli, a village in Uttar Pradesh, India

Iran
 Bari, West Azerbaijan
 Bari, East Azerbaijan
 Bari, Zanjan
 Bari, Iran (disambiguation)

Italy
 Bari Sardo, Sardinia
 Mola di Bari, Bari, Puglia, Italy
 Province of Bari, Apulia
 Sammichele di Bari, Bari, Puglia, Italy

Other places
 Bari, Kano State, Nigeria
 Aima Bari, Jhelum, Pakistan
 Bari, Somalia, northern Somalia

People 
 Bari (name)
 ASAP Bari (born 1991), nickname of Jabari Shelton, an American streetwear designer

Ethnic groups 
 Barí people, an indigenous group of Colombia and Venezuela referred to in Spanish as "Motilón"
 Bari people, an ethnic group in South Sudan
 Bari language, their language
 Bari tribes of Pakistan

Nobility 
 Grimoald, Prince of Bari, the prince of Bari from 1121 to 1132
 Jaquintus, Prince of Bari (died 1139), prince of Bari from 1138 to 1139
 Tancred, Prince of Bari (born 1119), prince of Bari and Taranto from 1132 to 1138

Music 
 Bari, a Caribbean drum (also music genre and dance) found in Bonaire and Curaçao
 Baritone horn
 Baritone saxophone
 Barí, a 2002 album by the group Ojos de Brujo

Sports
 Bari Grand Prix, a road race held in Bari, Italy
 London Bari F.C., a football team in England
 SSC Bari, a football club located in Bari, Italy

Other 
 47th Infantry Division Bari, an Italian infantry division of World War II
 Barbari goat or bari goat
 Bari Airport, Bari, Italy
 Fath al-Bari, a Sunni commentary of Sahih Bukhari
 University of Bari a university located in Bari, Italy
 al-Bari', one of the names of God in Islam
 Bari, a creature from The Legend of Zelda universe

See also 
 Bari Bari Densetsu, motorbike racing manga series
 Bary (disambiguation)
 Heinrich Anton de Bary (1831–1888), German surgeon and biologist